This is a list of bridge failures.

Before 1800

1800–1899

1900–1949

1950–1999

2000–present

Bridge disasters in fiction
Harry Potter and the Half-Blood Prince (2005 novel): the fictional Brockdale Bridge, by the Death Eaters (replaced by the real-world Millennium Bridge, London in the 2009 film)
Final Destination 5 (2011 film)
 The Bridge over the River Kwai (1952 novel) and its 1957 film adaptation The Bridge on the River Kwai
The Bridge of San Luis Rey (1927 novel)
Ring of Fire (1961 film)
The Cassandra Crossing (1976 film)
The Good, the Bad, and the Ugly (1966 film): bridge intentionally destroyed by Blondie and Tuco
The General (1926 film)
Train Man (1999 novel): featuring destruction of rail bridges over the Mississippi River
X-Men: The Last Stand (2006 film): The Golden Gate Bridge is rerouted by mutants to create a path to Alcatraz Island 
Monsters vs. Aliens (2009 film): The Golden Gate Bridge is destroyed by a giant robot but Ginormica saves all of the commuters on it.
San Andreas (2015 film): movie that portrays the destruction of several notable structures in the western United States, including the Golden Gate Bridge, San Francisco-Oakland Bay Bridge, Hoover Dam and the Pat Tillman Bridge.
London Has Fallen (2016 film): bridges destroyed by terrorists
Gotham (2018 TV series episode): numerous bridges destroyed in Gotham
A Single Shard: bridge railing breaks and causes Crane-man's death
Godzilla (2014 film): Godzilla, under attack by the United States Navy while in pursuit of 2 MUTOs, walks through the road deck of the Golden Gate Bridge.

See also
 list of Washington state bridge failures 
 
 
 List of dam failures
 List of structural failures and collapses
 List of accidents and disasters by death toll
 List of road accidents
 Lists of rail accidents

References

External links
 BridgeForum collapse database

Bridge maintenance
History of structural engineering
Bridge failures
Bridge failures